Pseudanos is a genus of headstander from South America, where found in the Orinoco and Amazon Basins.

Species
There are currently five recognized species in this genus:
Pseudanos gracilis (Kner, 1858)
Pseudanos irinae R. Winterbottom, 1980
Pseudanos trimaculatus (Kner, 1858) (Threespot headstander)
Pseudanos varii Birindelli, F. C. T. Lima & Britski, 2012
Pseudanos winterbottomi Sidlauskas & dos Santos, 2005

References

Anostomidae
Fish of South America